Stefanos Voskarides  (born 1 February 1980) is a Cypriot retired football striker. Now he serves as assistant coach and board advisor at Cypriot Second Division club Othellos Athienou.

Career
Born  in Paphos, Cyprus, Voskarides began playing football for Cypriot side Evagoras Paphos in 1996–1997. Moreover, from 1997-1999 Stefanos Voskarides was playing for Apollon Limassol. The year 1999, he was acquired by Greek Alpha Ethniki side PAOK. He stayed with the club until 2004, twice winning the Greek Football Cup in 2001 and 2003. Voskarides left PAOK and signed with fellow, newly promoted Alpha Ethniki side Ergotelis. At the end of the season continued his career in the Beta Ethniki, the second tier of the Greek football league system, featuring for Veria and Kallithea until he returned to Cyprus in the summer of 2008, signing a contract with Anorthosis Famagusta.

During the calendar year 2008-2009 Anorthosis was participate at the Champions League group stage. In the summer of 2009, he signed with Nea Salamis Famagusta. He then moved to AEP Paphos in 2010, where he played until announcing his retirement as a professional football player

After his football career ended, Voskarides he was "active" in the sport he loved so much. Immediately has been hired as sport director of Cypriot clubs Pafos FC. Then, the next summer (July 2013) Aris Limassol offered a job to Stefanos Voskarides as a sport director. During his presence at ARIS he successfully managed to keep the team in the first category with a much lower budget. By October 2015 Stefanos Voskarides was hired from Digenis Morfou as a coach assistant. He stayed at this position for 2 years in a row. Then he became a head coach at the same team. From December 2017 until today he serves as Assistant coach and board advisor at Othellos F.C.

Honours
2000-2001: Winner of the Greek football Cup with PAOK Thessalonikis
2002-2003: Winner of the Greek football Cup with PAOK Thessalonikis
2008-2009: Participate at the Champions League group stage with Anorthosis Famagusta
2015: Manages to close the deal between KEP & Cyprus national team as a main sponsor.

Club
PAOK
 Greek Football Cup: 2000–01, 2002–03

References

External links
Profile at Anorthosis.com

1980 births
Living people
People from Paphos
Cypriot footballers
Super League Greece players
Football League (Greece) players
Cypriot First Division players
Cypriot Second Division players
Apollon Limassol FC players
Anorthosis Famagusta F.C. players
PAOK FC players
Veria F.C. players
Ergotelis F.C. players
Kallithea F.C. players
Enosis Neon Paralimni FC players
Nea Salamis Famagusta FC players
AEP Paphos FC players
Association football forwards
Cypriot football managers